The Hebrew alphabet, known variously by scholars as the Ktav Ashuri, Jewish script, square script and block script, is an abjad script used in the writing of the Hebrew language and other Jewish languages, most notably Yiddish, Ladino, Judeo-Arabic, and Judeo-Persian. It is also used informally in Israel to write Levantine Arabic, especially among Druze. It is an offshoot of the Imperial Aramaic alphabet, which flourished during the Achaemenid Empire and which itself derives from the Phoenician alphabet.

Historically, two separate abjad scripts have been used to write Hebrew. The original, old Hebrew script, known as the paleo-Hebrew alphabet, has been largely preserved in a variant form as the Samaritan alphabet. The present "Jewish script" or "square script", on the contrary, is a stylized form of the Aramaic alphabet and was technically known by Jewish sages as Ashurit (lit. "Assyrian script"), since its origins were alleged to be from Assyria.

Various "styles" (in current terms, "fonts") of representation of the Jewish script letters described in this article also exist, including a variety of cursive Hebrew styles. In the remainder of this article, the term "Hebrew alphabet" refers to the square script unless otherwise indicated.

The Hebrew alphabet has 22 letters. It does not have case. Five letters have different forms when used at the end of a word. Hebrew is written from right to left. Originally, the alphabet was an abjad consisting only of consonants, but is now considered an "impure abjad". As with other abjads, such as the Arabic alphabet, during its centuries-long use scribes devised means of indicating vowel sounds by separate vowel points, known in Hebrew as niqqud. In both biblical and rabbinic Hebrew, the letters     can also function as matres lectionis, which is when certain consonants are used to indicate vowels. There is a trend in Modern Hebrew towards the use of matres lectionis to indicate vowels that have traditionally gone unwritten, a practice known as "full spelling".

The  Yiddish alphabet, a modified version of the Hebrew alphabet used to write Yiddish, is a true alphabet, with all vowels rendered in the spelling, except in the case of inherited Hebrew words, which typically retain their Hebrew consonant-only spellings.

The Arabic and Hebrew alphabets have similarities because they are both derived from the Aramaic alphabet, which in turn derives either from paleo-Hebrew or the Phoenician alphabet, both being slight regional variations of the Proto-Canaanite alphabet used in ancient times to write the various Canaanite languages (including Hebrew, Moabite, Phoenician, Punic, et cetera).

History

The Canaanite dialects were largely indistinguishable before around 1000 BCE. An example of related early Semitic inscriptions from the area include the tenth-century Gezer calendar over which scholars are divided as to whether its language is Hebrew or Phoenician and whether the script is Proto-Canaanite or paleo-Hebrew.

A Hebrew variant of the Proto-Canaanite alphabet, called the paleo-Hebrew alphabet by scholars, began to emerge around 800 BCE. An example is the Siloam inscription (c. 700 BCE).

The paleo-Hebrew alphabet was used in the ancient kingdoms of Israel and Judah. Following the exile of the Kingdom of Judah in the 6th century BCE (the Babylonian captivity), Jews began using a form of the Imperial Aramaic alphabet, another offshoot of the same family of scripts, which flourished during the Achaemenid Empire. The Samaritans, who remained in the Land of Israel, continued to use the paleo-Hebrew alphabet. During the 3rd century BCE, Jews began to use a stylized, "square" form of the Aramaic alphabet that was used by the Persian Empire (and which in turn had been adopted from the Assyrians), while the Samaritans continued to use a form of the paleo-Hebrew script called the Samaritan alphabet. After the fall of the Persian Empire in 330 BCE, Jews used both scripts before settling on the square Assyrian form.

The square Hebrew alphabet was later adapted and used for writing languages of the Jewish diaspora – such as Karaim, the Judeo-Arabic languages, Judaeo-Spanish, and Yiddish. The Hebrew alphabet continued in use for scholarly writing in Hebrew and came again into everyday use with the rebirth of the Hebrew language as a spoken language in the 18th and 19th centuries, especially in Israel.

Description

General
In the traditional form, the Hebrew alphabet is an abjad consisting only of consonants, written from right to left. It has 22 letters, five of which use different forms at the end of a word.

Vowels
In the traditional form, vowels are indicated by the weak consonants Aleph, He, Waw/Vav, or  Yodh serving as vowel letters, or matres lectionis: the letter is combined with a previous vowel and becomes silent, or by imitation of such cases in the spelling of other forms. Also, a system of vowel points to indicate vowels (diacritics), called niqqud, was developed. In modern forms of the alphabet, as in the case of Yiddish and to some extent Modern Hebrew, vowels may be indicated. Today, the trend is toward full spelling with the weak letters acting as true vowels.

When used to write Yiddish, vowels are indicated, using certain letters, either with niqqud diacritics (e.g.  or ) or without (e.g.  or ), except for Hebrew words, which in Yiddish are written in their Hebrew spelling.

To preserve the proper vowel sounds, scholars developed several different sets of vocalization and diacritical symbols called nequdot (literally "points"). One of these, the Tiberian system, eventually prevailed. Aaron ben Moses ben Asher, and his family for several generations, are credited for refining and maintaining the system. These points are normally used only for special purposes, such as Biblical books intended for study, in poetry or when teaching the language to children. In everyday writing of modern Hebrew, niqqud are absent; however, patterns of how words are derived from Hebrew roots (called shorashim or "triliterals") allow Hebrew speakers to determine the vowel-structure of a given word from its consonants based on the word's context and part of speech.

Alphabet
Unlike the Paleo-Hebrew writing script, the modern Ashuri script has five letters that have special final forms, called sofit (meaning in this context "final" or "ending") form, used only at the end of a word, somewhat as in the Greek or in the Arabic and Mandaic alphabets. These are shown below the normal form in the following table (letter names are Unicode standard). Although Hebrew is read and written from right to left, the following table shows the letters in order from left to right.

Pronunciation

Alphabet

The descriptions that follow are based on the pronunciation of modern standard Israeli Hebrew.

By analogy with the other dotted/dotless pairs, dotless tav, ת, would be expected to be pronounced /θ/ (voiceless dental fricative), and dotless dalet ד as /ð/ (voiced dental fricative), but these were lost among most Jews due to their not existing in the countries where they lived (such as in nearly all of Eastern Europe). Yiddish modified /θ/ to /s/ (cf. seseo in Spanish), but in modern Israeli Hebrew, it is simply pronounced /t/. Likewise, historical /ð/ is simply pronounced /d/.

Shin and sin

Shin and sin are represented by the same letter, but are two separate phonemes. When vowel diacritics are used, the two phonemes are differentiated with a shin-dot or sin-dot; the shin-dot is above the upper-right side of the letter, and the sin-dot is above the upper-left side of the letter.

Historically, left-dot-sin corresponds to Proto-Semitic *, which in biblical-Judaic-Hebrew corresponded to the voiceless alveolar lateral fricative , as evidenced in the Greek transliteration of Hebrew words such as balsam (the ls – 'שׂ') as is evident in the Targum Onkelos.

Dagesh

Historically, the consonants  bet,  gimmel,  daleth,  kaf,  pe and  tav each had two sounds: one hard (plosive), and one soft (fricative), depending on the position of the letter and other factors. When vowel diacritics are used, the hard sounds are indicated by a central dot called dagesh, while the soft sounds lack a dagesh. In modern Hebrew, however, the dagesh only changes the pronunciation of  bet,  kaf, and  pe, and does not affect the name of the letter.  The differences are as follows:

In other dialects (mainly liturgical) there are variations from this pattern.
In some Sephardi and Mizrahi dialects, bet without dagesh is pronounced , like bet with dagesh
In Syrian and Yemenite Hebrew, gimel without dagesh is pronounced .
In Yemenite Hebrew, and in the Iraqi pronunciation of the word "Adonai", dalet without dagesh is pronounced  as in "these"
In Ashkenazi Hebrew, as well as Krymchaki Hebrew, tav without dagesh is pronounced  as in "silk"
In Iraqi and Yemenite Hebrew, and formerly in some other dialects, tav without dagesh is pronounced  as in "thick"

Sounds represented with diacritic geresh

The symbol resembling an apostrophe after the Hebrew letter modifies the pronunciation of the letter and is called a geresh.

The pronunciation of the following letters can also be modified with the geresh diacritic. The represented sounds are however foreign to Hebrew phonology, i.e., these symbols mainly represent sounds in foreign words or names when transliterated with the Hebrew alphabet, and not loanwords.

Geresh is also used to denote an abbreviation consisting of a single Hebrew letter, while gershayim (a doubled geresh) are used to denote acronyms pronounced as a string of letters; geresh and gershayim are also used to denote Hebrew numerals consisting of a single Hebrew letter or of multiple Hebrew letters, respectively.  Geresh is also the name of a cantillation mark used for Torah recitation, though its visual appearance and function are different in that context.

Identical pronunciation
In much of Israel's general population, especially where Ashkenazic pronunciation is prevalent, many letters have the same pronunciation. They are as follows:

* Varyingly

Ancient Hebrew pronunciation

Some of the variations in sound mentioned above are due to a systematic feature of Ancient Hebrew. The six consonants  were pronounced differently depending on their position. These letters were also called BeGeD KeFeT letters . The full details are very complex; this summary omits some points. They were pronounced as plosives  at the beginning of a syllable, or when doubled. They were pronounced as fricatives  when preceded by a vowel (commonly indicated with a macron, ḇ ḡ ḏ ḵ p̄ ṯ). The plosive and double pronunciations were indicated by the dagesh. (Sefer Yetzirah, 4:1)

  chet and  ayin represented pharyngeal fricatives,  tsadi represented the emphatic consonant ,  tet represented the emphatic consonant , and  qof represented the uvular plosive . All these are common Semitic consonants.
  sin (the  variant of  shin) was originally different from both  shin and  samekh, but had become  the same as  samekh by the time the vowel pointing was devised. Because of cognates with other Semitic languages, this phoneme is known to have originally been a lateral consonant, most likely the voiceless alveolar lateral fricative  (the sound of modern Welsh ll) or the voiceless alveolar lateral affricate  (like Náhuatl tl).

Regional and historical variation

The following table contains the pronunciation of the Hebrew letters in reconstructed historical forms and dialects using the International Phonetic Alphabet. The apostrophe-looking symbol after some letters is not a yud but a geresh. It is used for loanwords with non-native Hebrew sounds. The dot in the middle of some of the letters, called a "dagesh kal", also modifies the sounds of the letters ב, כ and פ in modern Hebrew (in some forms of Hebrew it modifies also the sounds of the letters ג, ד and/or ת; the "dagesh chazak" – orthographically indistinguishable from the "dagesh kal" – designates gemination, which today is realized only rarely – e.g. in biblical recitations or when using Arabic loanwords).
{|class="wikitable"
|-
! rowspan="3" | Symbol
! colspan="9" ! | Pronunciation
|-
! rowspan="2" ! | Israeli
! rowspan="2" ! | Ashkenazi
! rowspan="2" ! | Sephardi
! rowspan="2" ! | Yemenite
! colspan="3" ! | Reconstructed
! rowspan="2" |Arabic equivalent
|-
! Tiberian !! Mishnaic !! Biblical
|-
| align="center" lang="hbo" style="font-size:200%" dir="rtl" |
||  || [ – ] ||  ||  ||  ||  || 
| / 
|-
| align="center" lang="hbo" style="font-size:200%" dir="rtl" |
||   ||  ||  ||  ||  || 
| rowspan="2" | 
|
|-
| align="center" lang="hbo" style="font-size:200%" dir="rtl" |
||  ||  ||  ||  ||  || 
|
|-
| align="center" lang="hbo" style="font-size:200%" dir="rtl" |
| rowspan="2" | 
| rowspan="2" | 
|  ||  ||  || 
| rowspan="2" | 
|
|-
| align="center" lang="hbo" style="font-size:200%" dir="rtl" |
|  ||  ||  || 
|
|-
| align="center" lang="hbo" style="font-size:200%" dir="rtl" |
| rowspan="2" | 
| rowspan="2" | 
|  ||  ||  || 
| rowspan="2" | 
|
|-
| align="center" lang="hbo" style="font-size:200%" dir="rtl" |
||  ||  ||  || 
|
|-
| align="center" lang="hbo" style="font-size:200%" dir="rtl" |
||  ||  ||  ||  ||  ||  || 
|
|-
| align="center" lang="hbo" style="font-size:200%" dir="rtl" |
||  ||  ||  ||  ||  ||  || 
|
|-
| align="center" lang="hbo" style="font-size:200%" dir="rtl" |
|  ||  ||  ||  || ? || ? || ?
|
|-
| align="center" lang="hbo" style="font-size:200%" dir="rtl" |
|  ||  ||  ||  || ? || ? || ?
|
|-
| align="center" lang="hbo" style="font-size:200%" dir="rtl" |
||  ||  ||  ||  ||  ||  || 
|
|-
| align="center" lang="hbo" style="font-size:200%" dir="rtl" |
||  ||  ||  ||  ||  ||  || 
|
|-
| align="center" lang="hbo" style="font-size:200%" dir="rtl" |
||  ||  ||  ||  (1) ||  ||  (2) ||  (3)
|
|-
| align="center" lang="hbo" style="font-size:200%" dir="rtl" |
||  ||  ||  ||  ||  ||  || 
|
|-
| align="center" lang="hbo" style="font-size:200%" dir="rtl" |ִ
|  ||  ||  ||  || ? || ? || ?
|
|-
| align="center" lang="hbo" style="font-size:200%" dir="rtl" |
||  ||  ||  ||  ||  || 
| rowspan="2" |
|
|-
| align="center" lang="hbo" style="font-size:200%" dir="rtl" |
||  ||  ||  ||  ||  || 
|
|-
| align="center" lang="hbo" style="font-size:200%" dir="rtl" |
||  ||  ||  ||  ||  ||  || 
|
|-
| align="center" lang="hbo" style="font-size:200%" dir="rtl" |
||  ||  ||  ||  ||  ||  || 
|
|-
| align="center" lang="hbo" style="font-size:200%" dir="rtl" |
||  ||  ||  ||  ||  ||  || 
|
|-
| align="center" lang="hbo" style="font-size:200%" dir="rtl" |
||  ||  ||  ||  ||  ||  || 
|  / 

|-
| align="center" lang="hbo" style="font-size:200%" dir="rtl" |
|| [ʕ, - ] || [ – ] ||  - ] || ||  ||  || 
|
|-
| align="center" lang="hbo" style="font-size:200%" dir="rtl" |
||  ||  ||  ||  ||  || 
| rowspan="2" | 
|
|-
| align="center" lang="hbo" style="font-size:200%" dir="rtl" |
||  ||  ||  ||  ||  || 
|
|-
| align="center" lang="hbo" style="font-size:200%" dir="rtl" |
||  ||  ||  ||  (1) ||  ||  (2) ||  (3)
|
|-
| align="center" lang="hbo" style="font-size:200%" dir="rtl" |
|
|-
| align="center" lang="hbo" style="font-size:200%" dir="rtl" |
||  || ~ || ~ || ~ ||  ||  || 
|
|-
| align="center" lang="hbo" style="font-size:200%" dir="rtl" |
||  ||  ||  ||  ||  ||  || 
|
|-
| align="center" lang="hbo" style="font-size:200%" dir="rtl" |
||  ||  ||  ||  ||  ||  || 
|
|-
| align="center" lang="hbo" style="font-size:200%" dir="rtl" |
| rowspan="2" | 
| 
| rowspan="2" | 
|  ||  || 
| rowspan="2" | 
|
|-
| align="center" lang="hbo" style="font-size:200%" dir="rtl" |
||  ||  ||  || 
|
|}

 velarized or pharyngealized
 pharyngealized
 sometimes said to be ejective but more likely glottalized.

Vowels

Matres lectionis

 alef,  ayin,  waw/vav and  yod are letters that can sometimes indicate a vowel instead of a consonant (which would be, respectively).

{|class="wikitable"
|-
!Letter!!Nameof letter!!Consonant indicatedwhen letterconsonantal||Voweldesignation!!Name ofvowel designation||IndicatedVowel
|- align=center
| style="font-size:200%;"| 
|| alef||  || — || —
|| ê, ệ, ậ, â, ô
|- align=center
| style="font-size:200%;"| 
|| ayin||  or || — || —
|| ê, ệ, ậ, â, ô
|- align=center
|rowspan=2 style="font-size:200%;"| 
|rowspan=2| waw/vav
|rowspan=2|  or 
| style="font-size:200%;"| 
|ḥolám malé
| ô
|- align=center
| style="font-size:200%;"| 
|shurúq
| û
|- align=center
|rowspan=2 style="font-size:200%;"| 
|rowspan=2| yud
|rowspan=2| 
|
|ḥiríq malé
| î
|- align=center
|
|tseré malé
| ê, ệ
|}

Vowel points

Niqqud is the system of dots that help determine vowels and consonants. In Hebrew, all forms of niqqud are often omitted in writing, except for children's books, prayer books, poetry, foreign words, and words which would be ambiguous to pronounce. Israeli Hebrew has five vowel phonemes, but many more written symbols for them:

Note 1: The circle represents whatever Hebrew letter is used.
Note 2: The pronunciation of tsere and sometimes segol – with or without the letter yod – is sometimes ei in Modern Hebrew. This is not correct in the normative pronunciation and not consistent in the spoken language.
Note 3: The dagesh, mappiq, and shuruk have different functions, even though they look the same.
Note 4: The letter ו (waw/vav) is used since it can only be represented by that letter.

Meteg

By adding a vertical line (called Meteg) underneath the letter and to the left of the vowel point, the vowel is made long. The meteg is only used in Biblical Hebrew, not Modern Hebrew.

Sh'va

By adding two vertical dots (called Sh'va) underneath the letter, the vowel is made very short. When sh'va is placed on the first letter of the word, mostly it is "è" (but in some instances, it makes the first letter silent without a vowel (vowel-less): e.g. וְ wè to "w")

Comparison table

Gershayim

The symbol  is called a gershayim and is a punctuation mark used in the Hebrew language to denote acronyms. It is written before the last letter in the acronym, e.g. . Gershayim is also the name of a cantillation mark in the reading of the Torah, printed above the accented letter, e.g. .

Stylistic variants

The following table displays typographic and chirographic variants of each letter. For the five letters that have a different final form used at the end of words, the final forms are displayed beneath the regular form.

The block (square, or "print" type) and cursive ("handwritten" type) are the only variants in widespread contemporary use. Rashi is also used, for historical reasons, in a handful of standard texts.

Yiddish symbols

Numeric values of letters

Following the adoption of Greek Hellenistic alphabetic numeration practice, Hebrew letters started being used to denote numbers in the late 2nd century BC, and performed this arithmetic function for about a thousand years. Nowadays alphanumeric notation is used only in specific contexts, e.g. denoting dates in the Hebrew calendar, denoting grades of school in Israel, other listings (e.g. שלב א׳, שלב ב׳ – "phase a, phase b"), commonly in Kabbalah (Jewish mysticism) in a practice known as gematria, and often in religious contexts.

The numbers 500, 600, 700, 800 and 900 are commonly represented by the juxtapositions ק״ת, ר״ת, ש״ת, ת״ת, and ק״תת respectively.
Adding a geresh ("׳") to a letter multiplies its value by one thousand, for example, the year 5778 is portrayed as ה׳תשע״ח, where ה׳ represents 5000, and תשע״ח represents 778.

Transliterations and transcriptions

The following table lists transliterations and transcriptions of Hebrew letters used in Modern Hebrew.

Clarifications:
For some letters, the Academy of the Hebrew Language offers a precise transliteration that differs from the regular standard it has set. When omitted, no such precise alternative exists and the regular standard applies.
The IPA phonemic transcription is specified whenever it uses a different symbol from the one used for the regular standard Israeli transliteration.
The IPA phonetic transcription is specified whenever it differs from IPA phonemic transcription.

Note: SBL's transliteration system, recommended in its Handbook of Style, differs slightly from the 2006 precise transliteration system of the Academy of the Hebrew Language; for "צ" SBL uses "ṣ" (≠ AHL "ẓ"), and for בג״ד כפ״ת with no dagesh, SBL uses the same symbols as for with dagesh (i.e. "b", "g", "d", "k", "f", "t").

Notes
A1234In transliterations of modern Israeli Hebrew, initial and final ע (in regular transliteration), silent or initial א, and silent ה are not transliterated. To the eye of readers orientating themselves on Latin (or similar) alphabets, these letters might seem to be transliterated as vowel letters; however, these are in fact transliterations of the vowel diacritics – niqqud (or are representations of the spoken vowels). E.g., in אִם ("if"), אֵם ("mother") and אֹם ("nut"), the letter א always represents the same consonant:  (glottal stop), whereas the vowels /i/, /e/ and /o/ respectively represent the spoken vowel, whether it is orthographically denoted by diacritics or not. Since the Academy of the Hebrew Language ascertains that א in initial position is not transliterated, the symbol for the glottal stop  ʾ  is omitted from the transliteration, and only the subsequent vowels are transliterated (whether or not their corresponding vowel diacritics appeared in the text being transliterated), resulting in "im", "em" and "om", respectively.

B123The diacritic geresh – "׳" – is used with some other letters as well (ד׳, ח׳, ט׳, ע׳, ר׳, ת׳), but only to transliterate from other languages to Hebrew – never to spell Hebrew words; therefore they were not included in this table (correctly translating a Hebrew text with these letters would require using the spelling in the language from which the transliteration to Hebrew was originally made). The non-standard "ו׳" and "וו"  are sometimes used to represent , which like ,  and  appears in Hebrew slang and loanwords.

C12The Sound  (as "ch" in loch) is often transcribed "ch", inconsistently with the guidelines specified by the Academy of the Hebrew Language: חם  → "cham"; סכך  → "schach".

DAlthough the Bible does include a single occurrence of a final pe with a dagesh (Book of Proverbs 30, 6: ""), in modern Hebrew  is always represented by pe in its regular, not final, form "פ", even when in final word position, which occurs with loanwords (e.g. שׁוֹפּ  "shop"), foreign names (e.g. פִילִיפּ  "Philip") and some slang (e.g. חָרַפּ  "slept deeply").

Religious use
The letters of the Hebrew alphabet have played varied roles in Jewish religious literature over the centuries, primarily in mystical texts. Some sources in classical rabbinical literature seem to acknowledge the historical provenance of the currently used Hebrew alphabet and deal with them as a mundane subject (the Jerusalem Talmud, for example, records that "the Israelites took for themselves square calligraphy", and that the letters "came with the Israelites from Ashur [Assyria]"); others attribute mystical significance to the letters, connecting them with the process of creation or the redemption. In mystical conceptions, the alphabet is considered eternal, pre-existent to the Earth, and the letters themselves are seen as having holiness and power, sometimes to such an extent that several stories from the Talmud illustrate the idea that they cannot be destroyed.

The idea of the letters' creative power finds its greatest vehicle in the Sefer Yezirah, or Book of Creation, a mystical text of uncertain origin which describes a story of creation highly divergent from that in the Book of Genesis, largely through exposition on the powers of the letters of the alphabet. The supposed creative powers of the letters are also referenced in the Talmud and Zohar.

Another book, the 13th-century Kabbalistic text Sefer HaTemunah, holds that a single letter of unknown pronunciation, held by some to be the four-pronged shin on one side of the teffilin box, is missing from the current alphabet. The world's flaws, the book teaches, are related to the absence of this letter, the eventual revelation of which will repair the universe. Another example of messianic significance attached to the letters is the teaching of Rabbi Eliezer that the five letters of the alphabet with final forms hold the "secret of redemption".

In addition, the letters occasionally feature in aggadic portions of non-mystical rabbinic literature. In such aggada the letters are often given anthropomorphic qualities and depicted as speaking to God. Commonly their shapes are used in parables to illustrate points of ethics or theology. An example from the Babylonian Talmud (a parable intended to discourage speculation about the universe before creation):

Extensive instructions about the proper methods of forming the letters are found in Mishnat Soferim, within Mishna Berura of Yisrael Meir Kagan.

Mathematical use
See aleph number and beth number and gimel function.

The 2nd element  is the cardinality of the continuum. Very occasionally, gimel is used in cardinal notation.

Unicode and HTML

The Unicode Hebrew block extends from U+0590 to U+05FF and from U+FB1D to U+FB4F. It includes letters, ligatures, combining diacritical marks (Niqqud and cantillation marks) and punctuation. The Numeric Character References is included for HTML. These can be used in many markup languages, and they are often used in Wiki to create the Hebrew glyphs compatible with the majority of web browsers.

Standard Hebrew keyboards have a 101-key layout.  Like the standard QWERTY layout, the Hebrew layout was derived from the order of letters on Hebrew typewriters.

See also
Hebrew braille
Hebrew diacritics
Cursive Hebrew
Hebrew punctuation
Hebrew spelling
Help:Hebrew
Inverted nun
Koren Type
Ktiv hasar niqqud ("spelling lacking niqqud")
Significance of numbers of Judaism

Notes

bThe Arabic letters generally (as six of the primary letters can have only two variants) have four forms, according to their place in the word. The same goes with the Mandaic ones, except for three of the 22 letters, which have only one form.

cIn forms of Hebrew older than Modern Hebrew, כ״ף, בי״ת and פ״א can only be read b, k and p, respectively, at the beginning of a word, while they will have the sole value of v, kh and f in a sofit (final) position, with few exceptions. In medial positions, both pronunciations are possible. In Modern Hebrew this restriction is not absolute, e.g. פִיזִיקַאי  and never  (= "physicist"), סְנוֹבּ  and never  (= "snob"). A dagesh may be inserted to unambiguously denote the plosive variant: בּ = , כּ = , פּ =; similarly (though today very rare in Hebrew and common only in Yiddish) a rafé placed above the letter unambiguously denotes the fricative variant: בֿ = , כֿ =  and פֿ = . In Modern Hebrew orthography, the sound  at the end of a word is denoted by the regular form "פ", as opposed to the final form "ף", which always denotes  (see table of transliterations and transcriptions, comment).

dHowever, וו (two separate vavs), used in Ktiv male, is to be distinguished from the Yiddish ligature װ (also two vavs but together as one character).

e1e2e3e4e5The Academy of the Hebrew Language states that both  and  be indistinguishably represented in Hebrew using the letter Vav. Sometimes the Vav is indeed doubled, however not to denote  as opposed to  but rather, when spelling without niqqud, to denote the phoneme /v/ at a non-initial and non-final position in the word, whereas a single Vav at a non-initial and non-final position in the word in spelling without niqqud denotes one of the phonemes /u/ or /o/. To pronounce foreign words and loanwords containing the sound , Hebrew readers must therefore rely on former knowledge and context.

Explanatory footnotes

References

Bibliography
  ff.
 Hoffman, Joel M. 2004. In the Beginning: A Short History of the Hebrew Language. New York: New York University Press.
 Saenz-Badillos, Angel. 1993. A History of the Hebrew Language. Cambridge, England: Cambridge University Press.
 Steinberg, David. History of the Hebrew Language.
 Mathers table

External links

General

 How to draw letters
 Official Unicode standards document for Hebrew
 Unicode collation charts—including Hebrew letters, sorted by shape

Keyboards
 LiteType.com – Virtual & Interactive Hebrew Keyboard
 Mikledet.com – For typing Hebrew with an English keyboard (Hebrew keyboard|Hebrew layout)
 Prize Find: Oldest Hebrew Inscription  Biblical Archaeology Review

 
1st-millennium BC introductions
Alphabets
Assyrian (Ashuri) script
Language and mysticism
Right-to-left writing systems
Hebrews
Abjad writing systems